The Renault 19 is a small family car that was produced by the French car manufacturer Renault between 1988 and 1996. In Turkey and in Argentina, production continued until 2000. The internal development code for the 19 was X53, with the five door receiving the B53 chassis code, the three door being the C53, the Chamade the L53, and the Cabriolet the D53.

Overview

The R19 was presented in June 1988, with sales in the domestic French market beginning in September 1988. It was the replacement for the 9 and 11, both of which were ageing and outdated by the end of the 1980s. The R19 went on sale in right hand drive form for the British market in February 1989.

The R19 was styled by Giorgetto Giugiaro, featuring Renault's new E-type (or "Energy") 1.4 L engine and F type 1.7 L versions. Base models originally used the OHV C-type Cléon 1.2 and 1.4 L engines, depending on the market. While originally only available with an atmospheric diesel engine, a turbocharged version appeared in the beginning of 1992.

Intended to be Renault's last numeric named car, the 19 ushered in a new naming policy, with the saloon versions of the 19 being known as the 19 Chamade, to distinguish them from the hatchbacks. The saloon version was launched in 1989. In many markets, the Chamade badge was dropped following the facelift of 1992, with some replacing it with the "Europa" tag. The 19 Chamade customers were more often men, more often married and more rural and older than R19 hatchback buyers.

In 1991, a convertible bodystyle built by Karmann was first shown; only a small number of these were built with the Phase I design as it was facelifted shortly thereafter. The convertible version went on sale in the beginning of 1992; it was only available with the two most powerful engine options. Although the R19's exterior design (which was relatively conservative, like that of the Renault 9/11) received a muted response, it was praised for its interior comfort and handling.

For the fuel injected top versions, a four-speed automatic transmission became available in the fall of 1990. Lesser versions still made do with four- or five-speed manuals, or a three-speed automatic.

In the summer of 1992, a revamped model was introduced with a substantially restyled front and rear, while LHD market versions received a new dashboard and interior — RHD models retained the original design.

With the facelift, smaller "Energy" series units gradually replaced the old pushrod items, and 1.8 litre engines appeared at the top of the lineup, where they replaced the more powerful 1.7 units (the F3N). The R19 was sold in most of Europe until 1996, and was produced for some South American markets in Argentina until 2000 and for the Andean markets in Colombia until 2001.
Turkish production lasted a little longer than in the rest of Europe, also until the year 2000. The R19's platform and running gear would continue to be used in its replacement, the first generation Renault Mégane, which lasted for seven years.

The Renault 19 was awarded the 1989 Car of the Year in Spain and Germany, 1990 Car of the Year in Ireland, and 1993 Car of the Year in Argentina. It was sold in limited numbers in Japan through the Yanase Import Dealerships. The name "Chamade" wasn't used on Japanese-market saloons because it was too similar to the Daihatsu Charade, so these were called "Europa" instead. San Fu Motors in Taiwan began building two versions of the R19 locally in early 1990, aiming for a monthly output of 1,000 cars.

The R19 did well in Germany, a market French carmakers always had a hard time to crack. It was the best selling imported car in West Germany in 1990 and then in re-united Germany from 1991 to 1994.

16S

The Renault 19 16S (16V in some countries) was first shown towards the very end of 1988. It was only actually added to the lineup in the autumn of 1990, and was the only Renault 19 with a 16 valve engine. It had a distinctive air inlet on the bonnet, a rear spoiler, 15 inch Speedline SL401 alloy wheels, side skirts, twin headlamps, Recaro bucket seats with optional leather trim, four in one exhaust manifold and ABS braking system with optional trip computer, aircon and electric sunroof. The "S" is for Soupapes, French for valves.

It was praised for its excellent handling and rev happy F7P engine, which, along with the advanced Renix ECU, made it faster and more fuel efficient compared to most competitors. The braking system was upgraded to include  vented discs on the front and  discs on the rear as well as an uprated lower suspension setup and front strut bar.

Phase 1 editions benefited from unique front and rear bumpers with front indicators relocated into the bumpers to allow for the twin headlamps, while the Phase 2 retained the original bumpers found throughout the range but added colour coded tops, rubber inserts, and a discreet lower splitter. All bodystyles were offered with the 16 valve engine at one time or another, but were not available in all markets.

The last models (1995 to 1996) were called Executive and came with leather interior as standard.

A 16S version was also produced in Europe which was equipped as above – however, the earliest models did not sport the bonnet vent. The Phase 2 models gear ratios were also revised, to allow for the extra weight found in the safety equipment the later models carried.

This engine was only available in the Phase 1 model.

Motorsport
Renault Sport used the 19 in the British Touring Car Championship in 1993, driven by Alain Menu and Tim Harvey.  The car proved uncompetitive except in wet conditions, and was replaced with the Laguna for the 1994 season.

Engines

 Only for South America

Manufacturing factories
 Douai (France)
 Maubeuge (France)
 Haren-Vilvoorde (Belgium)
 Laguna de Duero, Valladolid (Spain)
 Villamuriel de Cerrato, Palencia (Spain)
 Setúbal (Portugal)
 Santa Isabel, Córdoba (Argentina)
 Envigado (Colombia)
 Oyak-Renault, Bursa (Turkey)
 Sanfu Motor Co., Ltd. (Defunct), Taichung (Taiwan)
Avtoframos, Moscou (Russia), from november 1999

References

External links

Brief history and technical specifications of the Renault 19
Resource for Classic Renault owners and 19 Enthusiasts

19
Compact cars
Sedans
Hatchbacks
Convertibles
Front-wheel-drive vehicles
1990s cars
2000s cars
Cars introduced in 1988
Cars of Turkey
Touring cars
Police vehicles
Cars discontinued in 2000